(), also called , refers to a traditional Chinese ornament which uses long pheasant tail feather appendages to decorate some headdress in , Chinese opera costumes. In Chinese opera, the  not only decorative purpose but are also used express thoughts, feelings, and the drama plot. They are typically used on the helmets of warriors, where a pair of pheasant feathers extensions are the indicators that the character is a warrior figure; the length of the feathers, on the other hand, is an indicator of the warrior's rank. The  are generally about five or six feet long. Most of the time,  are used to represent handsome military commanders.

Origins 
Similar headgear decorated with pairs of  worn the military can be seen in paintings dating to the Ming dynasty.

During the Warring States period, King Wuling of Zhao adopted the  policy and a -style  which looks similar to the conical hat of the Scythian was adopted. King Wuling's -style  was less pointy than the actual Scythian hat and he decorated his hat with a marten tail to denote his noble status. The King of Qin later give the -style  of King Wuling to his servant as an insult to King Wuling after the latter had destroyed the regime of the Zhao state.

Many years later, the  evolved into the military cap called .

The  was first worn in the state of Zhao to distinguish military officers during the Warring States period. The  was possibly itself derived from the -style  adopted by King Wuling through  policy. The snow pheasant was a symbolism of martial valour and courage due to its association with the snow pheasant which would fight its opponent until death.

Skills and manipulation 

When combined the movements of the head and body of the actor, the movement of the  express the feelings and dispositions of the character, which include the expression of surprise, hatred, happiness, and frivolity.

See also 

 Chinese opera
 
  – Chinese opera costume
 Hanfu
 Guzhuang

Gallery

Notes

References 

Chinese traditional clothing
Performing arts
Costume design